Edina may refer to:

Edina, Liberia
Edina, Minnesota
Edina Realty
Edina Library
Edina High School
Edina Public Schools
Galleria Edina
Edina Mill
Edina, Missouri
Edina Double Square Historic District
Edinburgh, as referred to by Scots poets
The Komenda/Edina/Eguafo/Abirem District in Ghana
EDINA, the JISC-funded UK data centre
Edina (name)